Zehra Naqvi (ज़हरा नक़वी) is an actress of Indian and English Australian origin who has been performing in the UK since 2000, best known as the voice of Elizabeth Afton / Circus Baby in the Five Nights at Freddy's series, a role shared with Heather Masters.

Filmography

References

External links
 

Actresses in Hindi cinema
Australian film actresses
Australian female models
Living people
1977 births
Place of birth missing (living people)